Hubert Pärnakivi (16 October 1932 Tallinn – 28 October 1993 Tartu) was an Estonian track and field athlete (long-distance runner) and veterinarian.

1957 he graduated from Estonian Agricultural Academy in veterinary medicine.

1958 and 1959 he won several medals in Soviet Union Championships.

1952-1963 he become 28-times Estonian champion in different long-distance disciplines. 

Personal bests: 800 m 1.54,1, 1000 m 2.30,7 (both in 1959), 1500 m 3.50,3 (1961), marathon 2:46.34,0 (1962).

Since 1963 he worked at Tartu Veterinary Hospital, 1977-1991 being the head of the hospital.

References

1932 births
1993 deaths
Estonian male long-distance runners
Estonian veterinarians
Estonian University of Life Sciences alumni
Athletes from Tallinn
Soviet male long-distance runners
Soviet physicians